Jiminy Peak may refer to:

Jiminy Peak, the southern high point of Potter Mountain (Taconic Mountains) in western Massachusetts
Jiminy Peak (ski area), a ski area located on that peak.